The 1908 Hillsdale Dales football team represented Hillsdale College during the 1908 college football season.

Schedule

 The contest against Hudson on November 14th is not recognized in Hillsdale's athletic records, nor any other 3rd party compilation of the team's 1908 season.

References

Hillsdale
Hillsdale Chargers football seasons
Hillsdale Dales football